The 2019 International Championship was a professional snooker tournament that took place from 4 to 11 August 2019 at the Baihu Media Broadcasting Centre in Daqing, China. It was the second ranking event of the 2019/2020 season and the eighth iteration of the International Championship first held in 2012.

Northern Irish cueist Mark Allen was the defending champion, after defeating Australian Neil Robertson in the previous year's final. Allen, however, lost 9–6 to England's Shaun Murphy in the semi-finals. Reigning world champion Judd Trump won the event and his 12th ranking championship with a 10–3 win over Murphy in the final. In winning the event, Trump returned to the world number one position, that he had last held in 2013.

Trump and Allen tied for the highest  during the televised stages, both scoring 141, with Trump also making 12  throughout the tournament. Qualifying for the event took place 14–17 June 2019 in Ponds Forge International Sports Centre in Sheffield, England. Tom Ford made the highest break of qualifying, with a maximum break, the fourth of his career, in his 6–1 win in qualifying over Fraser Patrick.

Tournament format
The event was the eighth iteration of the International Championship, having been first held in 2012. The event took place from 4–11 August 2019 at the Baihu Media Broadcasting Centre in Daqing, China. The event was the second ranking tournament of the 2019/20 snooker season after the 2019 Riga Masters won by Yan Bingtao.

Qualifying for the event was held from 14 to 17 June 2019 at the Ponds Forge International Sports Centre in Sheffield, England, featuring one first round match. Matches were played as best-of-11- until the semi-finals, which were played as best-of-17-frames, whilst the final was played as a best-of-19-frames.

Prize fund
The championship total fund was higher than that of the previous year's event, with a total of £802,000 (up from £775,000). The winner of the event received the same prize money as in previous years, at £175,000. The breakdown of prize money for this year is shown below:

 Winner: £175,000
 Runner-up: £75,000
 Semi-final: £32,000
 Quarter-final: £21,500
 Last 16: £13,500
 Last 32: £8,500
 Last 64: £4,750
 Highest break: £6,000
 Total: £802,000

Tournament summary
The championship began on 4 August 2019, with the first round alongside held over qualifier matches. Two matches in the heldover qualifier rounds were decided on a deciding frame. Ding Junhui defeated Simon Lichtenberg despite being 5–3 behind, whilst four-time world champion John Higgins defeated amateur under 21 world champion Wu Yize despite being 4–3 behind to the 15 year old. Judd Trump in his first tournament after winning the 2019 World Snooker Championship scored three  in his qualifier to defeat Jordan Brown 6–1.

Early rounds (first round–quarter-finals)
Two top-16 ranked players were defeated in first round; Mark Williams lost to Jak Jones and Barry Hawkins to Daniel Wells both 6–2. Ding Junhui defeated three fellow Chinese players in the first three rounds, overcoming Zhao Xintong, Xiao Guodong and Liang Wenbo to reach the quarter-finals. Defending champion Mark Allen conceded just four frames to draw Ding, having defeated Sam Craigie, Mark Davis (both 6–1) and Ali Carter (6–2). Allen defeated Ding 6–3 to reach the semi-finals. As the sole remaining Chinese player in the competition, some Chinese viewers were reported to have stopped watching the event.

Graeme Dott qualified to play Shaun Murphy in the second quarter-final. Dott defeated Michael White before defeating two world champions in Stuart Bingham and John Higgins to reach the quarter-final. Murphy, who had reached only the Scottish Open final in the previous season defeated Yuan Sijun 6–5 and Riga Masters champion Yan Bingtao 6–4 before drawing a rematch of the second round match at the 2019 World Championships against Neil Robertson. Murphy defeated Robertson on a deciding frame 6–5. Murphy defeated Dott 6–4 to draw Allen in the semi-final.

Three-time world champion Mark Selby reached the second semi-final, after defeating Liam Highfield and Ben Woollaston (both 6–3), before playing World Championship semi-finalists David Gilbert and Gary Wilson, defeating both on a deciding frame 6–5. World champion Judd Trump reached the semi-finals defeating Zhang Anda, Scott Donaldson, Joe Perry and Tom Ford.

Semi-final–final

The first semi-final took place on 9 August 2019, between Selby and Trump. In reaching the semi-finals, Trump was guaranteed to return to world number one after the tournament for the first time since 2013. Selby won three of the first four frames to lead 3–1. However, Trump won the next four frames to lead 5–3 after the first session with breaks of 97, 108, 97 and 116. In the second session, Trump won the first three frames to lead 8–3 including two more 90+ breaks. Selby took frame 12 before Trump won the match in frame 13 with a break of 72. After the match, Trump commented "It was probably somewhere near how I was playing to win the World Championship," describing his form within the match.

The second semi-final was a rematch of the 2019 Scottish Masters final between Murphy and Allen. Murphy won the first five frames of the match, with Allen not scoring a single point until frame four. Allen fought back to trail 3–6 after the first session. Murphy won the first frame of the second session, before Allen won the next two. Murphy won frame 13 to need just one more frame for victory. Allen won the next two frames to push the match into the interval. Murphy however won frame 15 to win the match 9–6 with a break of 66.

The final was played as a best-of-19-frames match held over two sessions on 11 August 2019, refereed by Lyu Xilin. Trump won the first five frames of the match making a century break in frame three. Murphy, however won three of the remaining four frames of the session to trail 3–6. On the resume of the match, Trump dominated the remaining frames, winning the next four frames to win the match 10–3, completing eight half-centuries in the match. The victory was Trump's twelfth ranking event title, twelfth match unbeaten in a row, and had scored twelve centuries during the event.

The win was the first time a reigning world champion won the first championship in which they had competed in after the event, since Ronnie O'Sullivan in 2008. In losing the event, Murphy commented that he was "disappointed" and that had not played well: "Judd swamped me, that was how it felt."

Main draw
Players in bold denote match winners.

Final

Qualifying
Matches were played between 14 and 17 June 2019 at the Ponds Forge International Sports Centre in Sheffield, England. Matches involving Mark Allen, Sam Craigie, Ding Junhui, John Higgins, Yan Bingtao, Sunny Akani, Anthony McGill and Judd Trump, were played in Daqing. All matches were the best-of-11-frames.

Century breaks

Televised stage centuries
A total of 63 century breaks were made during the televised stages of the tournament. Judd Trump and Mark Allen shared the highest break of the tournament, with both players making a break of 141. In addition, Trump made a total of 12 centuries, eight more than any other player. Four Centuries were made in held over matches, Three by Trump and one by Sam Craigie.

 141, 131, 116, 113, 111, 108, 102, 104, 102, 101, 100, 100  Judd Trump
 141, 119, 117, 101  Mark Allen
 137  Ali Carter
 136  Joe Perry
 133  Stephen Maguire
 132, 126, 100  Gary Wilson
 132  Xiao Guodong
 131, 126, 104, 101  Ding Junhui
 131  Tom Ford
 128, 108  Louis Heathcote
 127, 103  Mark Selby
 124, 104  Sam Craigie
 123, 105  Stuart Bingham
 121  Jimmy Robertson
 120, 105  Liang Wenbo
 119, 103, 102, 100  Neil Robertson
 118  Jak Jones
 116  Daniel Wells
 115, 103  Scott Donaldson
 115  Yuan Sijun
 111, 102  Luca Brecel
 110  Elliot Slessor
 109, 102, 101  David Gilbert
 107, 104  Kurt Maflin
 106, 103  Shaun Murphy
 105  Yan Bingtao
 102  Zhou Yuelong
 100  Kyren Wilson
 100  Liam Highfield
 100  Mark Joyce

Qualifying stage centuries
A total of 42 century breaks were made during the qualifying tournament preceding the event, including a maximum break from Tom Ford.

 147  Tom Ford
 139, 100  Luo Honghao
 137, 116  Joe Perry
 135  Scott Donaldson
 134, 103  Liam Highfield
 134, 124  Mark Selby
 133  Stuart Bingham
 132, 126  Lyu Haotian
 129, 108  Stephen Maguire
 127, 115, 112  Neil Robertson
 126, 112  Noppon Saengkham
 123, 104  Michael Holt
 120  Graeme Dott
 118, 102  Ali Carter
 118  Bai Langning
 115  Ashley Carty
 115  Tian Pengfei
 115  Xiao Guodong
 111  Chang Bingyu
 111  Gary Wilson
 111  Ryan Day
 108  Eden Sharav
 108  Yuan Sijun
 107  Brandon Sargeant
 107  Liang Wenbo
 106  Kurt Maflin
 105  Anthony Hamilton
 103  Louis Heathcote
 101  Jamie Clarke
 101  Mei Xiwen
 100  Hossein Vafaei

References

2019
2019 in snooker
2019 in Chinese sport
Sport in Daqing
August 2019 sports events in China